The Sleuth is a 1925 American silent comedy film starring Stan Laurel.

Cast
 Stan Laurel - Webster Dingle
 Glen Cavender - The husband
 Alberta Vaughn - The wife
 Anita Garvin - The other woman

See also
 List of American films of 1925
 Stan Laurel filmography

References

External links
 

1925 films
1925 comedy films
1925 short films
American silent short films
American black-and-white films
Films directed by Joe Rock
Films directed by Harry Sweet
Silent American comedy films
American comedy short films
1920s American films